The Vleeshal is a historical building dating from 1603 on the Grote Markt in Haarlem, the Netherlands.

History

Vleeshal means meat-hall; it was the only place in Haarlem where fresh meat was allowed to be sold from 1604 to the 18th century. The ox-heads on the front of the building indicate the function of the hall. The building was used for selling fresh meat; salted meat was sold in the Warmoesstraat, the street next to the building.

It was designed in renaissance style by Lieven de Key. It was built from 1602 to 1603. Before that there was already a small Vleeshal on the crossing of the Spekstraat and the Warmoesstraat, but around 1600 it had become too small, and the meat had to be sold outside. The new building was a prestigious project; expensive materials and a beautiful design were used. It opened on November 1, 1604. There was room for 40 different meat merchants in the building.

The building was in use as meat-hall until 1840. Afterwards it was used by the National Archive (Rijksarchief) and the Haarlem Public Library.

Two Museums
Since 1950 the building has been in use as a gallery by the Frans Hals Museum, which holds art exhibitions there under the name "Frans Hals Museum - Hal". The entrance to that museum is through the house directly to the right of the building. The cellar of the Vleeshal is used by the Archaeological Museum Haarlem, which has a permanent exhibition on various aspects of the archeology of Haarlem, as well as a modest exhibition area for new finds. The entrance to that museum is through the small door on the left leading down into the cellar.

Replicas
The West End Collegiate Church on West End Avenue in Manhattan, New Amsterdam is modeled after the Vleeshal.

References

External links
 Website

Buildings and structures completed in 1603
Museums in Haarlem
History of Haarlem
Rijksmonuments in Haarlem
Frans Hals Museum
1603 establishments in the Dutch Republic